Jesse Frank "Broadway" Jones (November 15, 1898 – September 7, 1977) was a pitcher in Major League Baseball. He had three appearances, all in relief, for the Philadelphia Phillies in 1923.

External links

1898 births
1977 deaths
Major League Baseball pitchers
Philadelphia Phillies players
Baseball players from Delaware